Sant Llorenç de la Muga is a municipality in the Alt Empordà comarca, in the Province of Girona, Catalonia, Spain with an area of 32.06 km2 and a population of 177 people.

Sant Llorenç de la Muga is situated 16 km from Figueres.

References

External links
Municipal website 
 Government data pages 

Municipalities in Alt Empordà
Populated places in Alt Empordà